Bothriechis is a genus of venomous pit vipers, commonly called palm vipers or palm-pitvipers found predominantly in Mexico and Central America, although the most common species, B. schlegelii, ranges as far south as Colombia and Peru. All members are relatively slender and arboreal. The name Bothriechis is derived from the Greek words bothros and echis that mean "pit" and "viper" respectively. Ten species and no subspecies are currently generally recognized.

Description
Species that belong to this genus typically reach lengths of 60–80 cm, while B. aurifer, B. bicolor and B. lateralis are known to grow to 1 m or more.

General characteristics include a sharply defined canthus rostralis, an unelevated snout, a rostral scale that is not as high as it is broad, and a prehensile tail that accounts for at least 15% of the body length.

The color pattern usually consists of a green ground color that may or may not include pale or dark markings. B. schlegelii is an exception to this rule.

Geographic range
Occurs in southern Mexico (southeastern Oaxaca and the northern highlands of Chiapas), through Central America to northern South America (Colombia, western Venezuela, Ecuador and northern Peru).

Behavior
As a general rule, species found above 1,500 meters altitude tend to be diurnal, while those found below 1,000 meters tend to be active at night. Those found between 1,000 and 1,500 meters may be active at any time of the day.

Venom
Bothriechis venom is primarily a haemotoxin which causes severe pain, swelling, bleb formation, bruising, and quite often necrosis. If untreated it can lead to loss of a limb, or even death. Each year several farmers and plantation workers are bitten by eyelash vipers, sometimes resulting in fatalities. Wyeth in the United States and Instituto Clodomiro Picado in Costa Rica both manufacture different polyvalent antivenins which can be used to treat eyelash viper envenomations.

Species
There are 11 recognized species.

T type species

Taxonomy
A new species from Guatemala and Honduras, B. thalassinus, was described by Campbell & E.N. Smith (2000). Campbell & Lamar (2004) recognize this species, as well as a ninth addition to the genus: B. supraciliaris, which was first described by Taylor (1954) as a subspecies of B. schlegelii, and is found in southwestern Costa Rica.

B. guifarroi was discovered in 2010 and described by Townsend et al. in 2013, in a study that included the following suggested phylogenetic tree of the genus:

References

Further reading

Campbell JA, Smith EN. 2000. "A new species of arboreal pitviper from the Atlantic versant of northern Central America". Revista de Biología Tropical 48: 1001-1013.
Cope ED. 1860 (dated 1859). "Catalogue of the venomous serpents in the museum of the Academy of Natural Sciences of Philadelphia, with notes on the families, genera and species". Proc. Acad. Nat. Sci. Philadelphia 11: 332-347 [338].
Peters W. 1859. "Über die von Hrn. Dr. Hoffmann in Costa Rica gesammelten und an das Königl. Zoologische Museum gesandten Schlangen". Monatsberichte der Preussischen Akademie Wissenschaften zu Berlin 1859: 275-278 [278].
Posada Arango A. 1889. Anales de la Academia de Medicina de Medellin 2: 45-49 [47].
Posada Arango A. 1889. Bulletin de la Société Zoologique de France, Paris 14: 343-345 [343].
Salvin O. 1860. "On the reptiles of Guatemala". Proceedings of the Zoological Society of London 1860: 451-461 [459].
Taylor EH. 1954. "Further studies on the serpents of Costa Rica". University of Kansas Science Bulletin 36 (11): 673-801.

External links

Crotalinae
 
Snake genera
Taxa named by Wilhelm Peters